Nadaillac-de-Rouge (Languedocien: Nadalhac) is a commune in the Lot department in south-western France.

Population

See also
Communes of the Lot department

References

Nadaillacderouge